Somewhere Over the Chemtrails is a 2022 Czech comedy drama film. It was presented at 72nd Berlin International Film Festival. It is a debut of director Adam Koloman Rybanský.

Plot
During the Easter market in a Czech village, a delivery van drives into the crowd, hits a resident and the driver flees. The village's volunteer fire brigade now wants to prove that they care about safety in the village. This event puts Broňa and Standa's friendship in danger: Firefighter Broňa is immediately sure that it is a terrorist attack committed by a migrant. Standa, on the other hand, approaches the incident from a different perspective. A laconic film about the causes of prejudice, racism and exclusion.

Cast
 Michal Isteník as Standa
 Miroslav Krobot as Broňa
 Anna Polívková as Standa's wife
 Vladimír Škultéty
 Jiří Vymětal
 Martin Šesták
 Václav Hrzina
 Marek Pospíchal

Production
Filming took a half of a year and concluded in March 2022. It took place primarily in Chvalnov-Lísky.

References

External links
 

2022 films
2022 comedy-drama films
Czech comedy-drama films
2020s Czech-language films
Films about firefighting